This article is about the relationship between the Catholic Church and theatre.

Overview 
Many bishops, priests, and monks have strongly condemned theatrical amusements, and they even declared the actors to be 'instruments of Satan', 'a curse to the Church', and 'beguiling unstable souls'. The Roman Catholic Church believed theatre caused people to "indulge themselves in amusements which its fascinations interfere with the prosecution of the serious work of daily life. Anything pleasing or appealing to the lower nature, the 'sensual appetites,' were considered as temptations as dictated in the Lord’s Prayer: 'Lead us not into temptation,' " which one must avoid in order to lead an ideal Christian life.

According to the Catholic Church, one must eat and drink for strength and not for gluttony and drunkenness, rest and sleep to the glory of God and not to sink into indolence and sloth nor to become the masters instead of the servants of the body, and amusements are the most dangerous temptations and the worst impulses, for otherwise many Christians will relax their ordinary strictness "for the sake of the cause," and that having once obtained a "taste of the nectar, they will continue to drink it". The Church instead encouraged Christians to strive to please their neighbours for good edification rather than pleasing oneself.

Even exclusively Catholic countries were tolerant of the church-goers: ordinary theatrical amusements was tolerated and the Church allowed the general population to patronize the theatre. In most of those countries, theatres were even allowed to be opened on Sunday evenings when the popular plays are put on the boards. However, during Lent, the Catholic Church would dissuade or even prohibit the people from going to the theatre, and in some countries, where the civil law was controlled by the Catholic Church, the theaters were closed during Lent.

19th century 

In the United States in the 19th century, actors endured the Church’s antitheatrical attacks, which included "social humiliations, aggressive animosity toward their profession and their lowly reputation. Religious attitude toward theatre not only hampered the profession as a whole but also humiliated them as individuals which also affected their family members". In the 1860s, James H. McVicker a theatre professional in Chicago had seen "a child refused admittance to a school, for a reason that the parents were connected with a theatre." In the same decade, the actress Anna Cora Mowatt stated that "being an actress, people considered her and all the actresses as immoral, flighty, silly buffoons who are not to be taken seriously for a moment." This was due to the low reputation the Roman Catholic Church had given to the theatre. The theatre was affected financially as well because in "many areas, townspeople were scared away from viewing the performances under the Church’s influence, and the difficulty in attracting audiences resulted in inability to pay actors living wages and forced some to abandon their professions." Travelling troupes, who perform in different cities had experienced difficulties getting help from the locals with the tasks of "finding a place to sleep, suitable place to perform, finding carpenters to build basic set ups, and finding musicians, etc., and the lack of local help was due to religious objection." The Church also influenced greatly in producing new actors as many parents, worried about the low reputation of the profession, discouraged their children from pursuing the career as an actor. "Noah Ludlow had to flee home to pursue his dream in theatre which his parents disapproved of, and even much later when he got married, his wife’s family pressured him to abandon his career on stage."

In France 
The theatres in France had even more restrictions and limitations as the actors turned to the royal patronage for financial aid by joining the state theatre, Comédie-Française. "The actors of this state theatre were considered as servants of the king and were expected to entertain at the court under the rules and regulations of the royal authority. Anything from assigning roles to the actors and demanding actors to be punctual on the rehearsals were strictly controlled by the royal authority. Playwrights were personally obligated to obtain official approvals from the Lieutenant-General of Police who read the manuscripts and gave approvals based on the rules revolved around the King as well as the Church and the political notables. Plays could not mock or violate Roman Catholic beliefs and ceremonies, nor it can satirize living public figures (including the monarch)"

The Catholic Church in France also condemned the theatre as a school for scandal, held all actors to be ipso facto excommunicated, and forbade their burial in consecrated ground, which included every cemetery in Paris. 

In fact, in 1730, Adrienne Lecouvreur died at the age of 38, but she was denied Christian burial and was hastily buried in the dead of night in an unmarked grave. This was because the Church in France still banned the actors from receiving any sacraments which included marriage, baptism, or final rites, and only by renouncing their professions first, they were able to receive the sacraments from the Church. Also, the Church refused Molière’s burial in the sanctified burial because he had not received the last rites with the priest present and that he did not renounce his profession as an actor before his death. When King Louis XIV directly intervened, the Archbishop of Paris allowed Molière to be buried only after sunset among the suicides’ and paupers’ graves with no requiem masses permitted in the Church.

Patristic views on theatre 

 Clement of Alexandria (150-215 A.D.): dramatic compositions are nonsense and empty and would only lead to human misery. Christ is the real, eternal truth in the theatre of the universe. Christians don't serve two masters so they must maintain distant from theatre which doesn't serve Christ.
 Tertullian (160-230 A.D.): first Latin Church Father was against the existence of permanent theatre. Tertullian interpreted the theatre of Pompeius as the theatre as a whole, as a dwelling place of the gods Venus and Liber, and a place where idololatria (capital crime of mankind including adultery, fraud, drunkenness, fornication; accumulation of deadly sins) committed. He thought theatre belonged to the pomp of the devil, and whoever went to theatre could not be an official.
 Arnobius (300 A.D.) and Lactantius (260-340 A.D.): Arnobius considered theatre to the special and favourable ground for the activity of the daemons to exercise their influence on humans. Lactantius says that with the conversion of Constantine in the fifth century, a Christian culture slowly began to emerge which was manifested in art, literature and Christian architecture which is committing idoloatria (capital crime; an accumulation of several deadly sins).
 Augustine (354-430 A.D.): the origin of the gods and the theatre are "deadly poison" and "crazy institution" rooted in demoralization and licentiousness and thus a dangerous influence on Roman youth. "The statues, effigies and altars of Roman theatres marked their theatres as the domain of the pagan gods, and theatre, with the rest of the pagan culture, substitutes the spiritual joy of knowing God through scripture with earthly obsessions." He discusses about the theatre in his texts: Confessions, The City of God, Concerning the Teacher, and On Christian Doctrine. In his Confessions, Augustine says he was attracted to theatre (the tragedies) and enjoyed the actor's performances which gave him things to grieve and pity from which he gained "harmful pleasure." Theatrical performances only affected the surface of his emotion, and as if he had been scratched with the poisoned fingernails, his life was filled with inflammation, swelling, putrefaction and corruption.
 Isidore of Seville (ca. 560-633 A.D.): emphasized the wickedness of the stage should not be blamed on men but on the daemons because they had initiated the theatre.

See also 
Criticism of the Catholic Church

Notes

References 

Actors
History of theatre